The 2011–12 Mercer Bears men's basketball team represented Mercer University during the 2011–12 NCAA Division I men's basketball season. The Bears, led by fourth year head coach Bob Hoffman, played their home games at the University Center and are members of the Atlantic Sun Conference. They finished the season 27–11, 13–5 in A-Sun play to finish in a tie for second place. They lost in the semifinals of the Atlantic Sun Basketball tournament to Florida Gulf Coast. They were invited to the 2012 CollegeInsider.com Tournament where they defeated Tennessee State, Georgia State, Old Dominion, Fairfield, and Utah State to be the 2012 CIT Champions.

Roster

Schedule

|-
!colspan=9| Exhibition

|-
!colspan=9| Regular season

|-
!colspan=9| 2012 Atlantic Sun men's basketball tournament

|-
!colspan=9| 2012 CIT

References

Mercer Bears men's basketball seasons
Mercer
Mercer
CollegeInsider.com Postseason Tournament championship seasons
Mercer Bears
Mercer Bears